Somatina nigridiscata is a moth of the  family Geometridae. It is found on Java.

References

Moths described in 1896
Scopulini